LAb[au] is an artist group founded 1997 in Brussels, Belgium with the aim to examine the influence of advanced technologies in the forms, methods and content of art. Members are: Manuel Abendroth, Jérôme Decock, and Els Vermang. Former members were: co-founder Naziha Mestaoui (until 2000), Grégoire Verhaegen (until 2003), Pieter Heremans (until 2006) and Alexandre Plennevaux (until 2009).

From the name 'LAb[au]' one can read in ‘LAB’ (standing for an experimental approach) and ‘BAU’ (ger. = construction / providing a link to Bauhaus) both a reference to the group's approach to work.

Laboratory for Architecture and Urbanism
With a background in architecture its members and projects are concerned with the construct of ‘space’ and the way it can be planned, experienced and conceptualised in an information age. The attention lies in the relation between architecture, light and advanced technologies.

The projects of LAb[au] deal with processes and systems based on different rules. This method is determined by the technological and artistic parameters and qualified by the artists as metadesign.

MediaRuimte

This alliance between theory and practice motivated the group to found the gallery 'MediaRuimte' in the city centre of Brussels in 2003. The gallery work stands for LAb[au]'s typical function as a collaborative art agency as for a trans-disciplinary work, being expressed through a program ranging not only over exhibitions, screenings and audiovisual performances, but also to conferences, artist-residencies and workshops. Featured artists range from Manfred Mohr to Nicolas Schöffer, Casey Reas, Limiteazero and Frank Bretschneider to Mika Vainio.

Exhibitions
 1999 Ars Electronica Linz, AU
 2000 Musée du Louvre Paris, FR
 several times Bauhaus Dessau, GER
 2002 ICA London, UK
 2003 Art Center Nabi Seoul, ROK
 2003 New Museum of Contemporary Art New York, US
 2004 Sónar Barcelona, ES
 several times Centre Georges Pompidou Paris, FR
 2006 TENT. / Witte de With Rotterdam, NL
 2007 Club/Transmediale Berlin, GER
 2008 Itaú Cultural São Paulo, BR
 2009 BOZAR Centre for Fine Arts Brussels, B
 2010 Kunst-Station Sankt Peter, Cologne, GER
 2016 Art Bermondsey Project Space London, UK

Artworks/Projects
 2001-... sPace Navigable Music
 2003-07 liquid space (with many artists ranging from Marius Watz to Frank Bretschneider, Holger Lippmann & Lev Manovich)
 2005 liquid space book
 2005 point, line, surface computed in seconds
 2006 PixFlow#1
 2006 12m4s
 2006 EOD #02 (with Frederik de Wilde)
 2006 Touch (on Dexia Tower)
 2007 Who's afraid of Red, Green & Blue? - chrono.tower (on Dexia Tower)
 2007 spectr[a]um (on Dexia Tower with Limiteazero, H. Lippmann, O. Bender & F. Bretschneider from raster-noton and the Balanescu Quartet)
 2007 PixFlow#2
 2008 Who's afraid of Red, Green & Blue? - weather.tower (on Dexia Tower)
 2008 Binary Waves
 2009 SwarmDots
 2009 Chrono Prints
 2009 Framework f5x5x5

References

External links
 
 MediaRuimte, LAb[au]'s gallery for electronic arts in downtown Brussels: mediaruimte.be
 Publication in Creative Review Magazine about the work of LAb[au] March 2008
 [DAM]Berlin profiling the work of LAb[au]
 LAB[au] interview on Digital Art Mag (2010, p 38-48): 

Belgian artist groups and collectives
Organizations established in 1997